This is a list of notable Lebanese individuals born in the Lebanese diaspora of Lebanese ancestry or people of dual Lebanese and foreign nationality who live in the diaspora.

Country listings:

Africa
Main listing: List of Lebanese people in Africa
List of Lebanese people in Ghana
List of Lebanese people in Ivory Coast
List of Lebanese people in Senegal
List of Lebanese people in Sierra Leone
List of Lebanese people in South Africa

Americas
List of Lebanese people in Argentina
List of Lebanese people in Brazil
List of Lebanese people in Canada
List of Lebanese people in the Caribbean
List of Lebanese people in Curaçao
List of Lebanese people in Dominican
Republic
List of Lebanese people in Haiti
List of Lebanese people in Jamaica
List of Lebanese people in Puerto Rico
List of Lebanese people in Chile
List of Lebanese people in Cuba
List of Lebanese people in Colombia
List of Lebanese people in Ecuador
List of Lebanese people in Guatemala
List of Lebanese people in Mexico
List of Lebanese people in the United States
List of Lebanese people in Uruguay
List of Lebanese people in Venezuela

Arab World
List of Lebanese people in Egypt
List of Lebanese people in Saudi Arabia
List of Lebanese people in Syria
List of Lebanese people in the United Arab Emirates

Europe
List of Lebanese people in Bulgaria
List of Lebanese people in Cyprus
List of Lebanese people in Denmark
List of Lebanese people in France
List of Lebanese people in Germany
List of Lebanese people in Italy
List of Lebanese people in Monaco
List of Lebanese people in the Netherlands
List of Lebanese people in Spain
List of Lebanese people in Sweden
List of Lebanese people in Switzerland
List of Lebanese people in the United Kingdom

Oceania
List of Lebanese people in Australia

See also
List of Lebanese people

Lists of Arabs